World Congress may refer to:

 Bahá'í World Congress
 Ukrainian World Congress, for Ukrainian communities in the diaspora
 World Amazigh Congress
 World Armenian Congress
 World Bosniak Congress
 World Cat Congress
 World Congress of Cardiology, for promoting research, training, and treatment of diseases of the heart
 World Congress of Families, for the traditional family
 World Congress of Intellectuals in Defense of Peace, convened in Wrocław, Poland, 1948
 World Congress of Philosophy, held every five years
 World Diamond Congress
 World Esperanto Congress
 World Harp Congress
 World Islamic Congress, convened in Jerusalem and attended by 130 delegates from 22 Muslim countries
 World Jewish Congress, founded in Geneva, Switzerland, in August 1936
 World Parkinson Congress
 World Peace Congress
 World Saxophone Congress
 World Universities Congress, hosted by Çanakkale Onsekiz Mart University between October 20–24, 2010
 World Uyghur Congress, of exiled Uyghur groups 
 World Wilderness Congress
 World Youth Congress

See also
 Congress, a formal meeting of representatives
 World Assembly